The Dixie Cavern salamander (Plethodon dixi) is a species of salamander in the family Plethodontidae. It is endemic to the state of Virginia in the United States. It is a troglobitic species restricted to the Dixie Caverns. It was commonly confused with Wehrle's salamander (P. wehrlei) and was merged with that species shortly after description, but a 2019 study reaffirmed it as a distinct species.

References 

Plethodon
Amphibians of the United States
Ecology of the Appalachian Mountains
Amphibians described in 1949
Endemic fauna of Virginia